The 1925 Stanford football team was an American football team that represented Stanford University as a member of the Pacific Coast Conference (PCC) during the 1925 PCC football season. In its second season under head coach Pop Warner, Stanford compiled a 7–2 record (4–1 against PCC opponents) and finished second in the PCC. Its only conference loss was against conference champion Washington. The team played its home games at Stanford Stadium in Stanford, California. The team was ranked No. 8 in the nation in the Dickinson System ratings released in January 1926.

In the first-ever meeting between Stanford and eventual conference rival UCLA, Stanford defeated the Bruins 82–0, which tied the record for Stanford's greatest margin of victory.

Stanford's fullback Ernie Nevers was selected as a consensus first-team player on the 1925 All-America team. Nevers was later inducted into both the College Football Hall of Fame and the Pro Football Hall of Fame. Other key players included end Ted Shipkey and guard Fred H. Swan.

Schedule

References

Stanford
Stanford Cardinal football seasons
Stanford football